Renfro may refer to:

 Renfro (surname)
 Renfro, Missouri, a community in the United States
 Renfro Foods, an American salsa, sauce, and relish producer
 Renfro Hotel, Park City, Kentucky, US
 Renfro Brands, an American sock and legwear company, a subsidiary of Renco Group
 Renfro Valley, Kentucky, US

See also

Renfrow (disambiguation)